The Khojas are a social group of South Asia.

Khoja may also refer to:

 Khoja (name), list of people with the name
 Khoja (Turkestan), term used for the descendants of the famous Central Asian Naqshbandi Sufi teacher, Ahmad Kasani
 Khoja, SBS Nagar, a village in Punjab, India
 Khawaja, an Islamic honorific title

See also
 
 Khawaja (disambiguation)